Beach water polo competition at the 2016 Asian Beach Games was held in Da Nang, Vietnam from 27 September to 1 October 2016 at the Bien Dong Park, Danang, Vietnam. Kazakhstan won the tournament in a round robin competition, Indonesia, which tied with China in both competition points and their head-to-head match, was awarded the silver medal based on having better head-to-head result against the highest ranked team Kazakhstan.

Medalists

Results

References

External links 
 Official website

2016 Asian Beach Games events
Asian Beach Games
2016